The Nordic harp is the Norwegian variant of the classical harp. The Nordic harp had fallen from use in Norway by 1823, but has since been rediscovered.

Players
 Erik Ask-Upmark (:sv:Erik Ask-Upmark )

References

Further reading
 Aksdal, Bjørn; Med piber og basuner, skalmeye og fiol – Musikkinstrumenter i Norge ca 1600-1800
 Bing, Morten; Kompendium om de norske bygdeharper, Norsk Folkemuseum
 Artikkel om House of Harrari, Dagen 13.5.94
 Grinde, Nils; Norsk Musikkhistorie, Universitetsforlaget
 Harrari, Shoshanna og Micah; Kompendium om bibelske harper
 Sørensen, Steinar; Nytt om gammalt, Glomdalmuseets årbok. 1987 
 Aksdal, Bjørn; «Sekkepipe og bondeharpe. En kort kildekritisk vurdering av instrumentenes forekomst i eldre norsk folkemusikktradisjon», I: Studia musicologica Norvegica. 8 (1982), s. 109 – 123

External links
 Nordic Harps.se
 Nordic Harp Meeting
 Den norske folkeharpa 
 Tradisjonsmusikkarkiv for Vest-Oppland 

Harps
Swedish musical instruments